Domenico Zindato (born 1966) is an Italian self-taught artist and draftsman who currently resides in Cuernevaca, Mexico.

Biography 

Domenico Zindato was born in 1966 in southern Italy’s Reggio Calabria province. He briefly studied law in Rome at "La Sapienza" University, before changing his focus to theater and cinema studies. After moving briefly to Milan, Zindato relocated to Berlin in 1988.

While in Berlin, Zindato continued to explore his interests in theater, music and performance and establish his own artistic identity. While managing a disco he also hosted his own cabaret-like performance that he describes as being influenced by Dada and Surrealism. After leaving Europe, he traveled throughout Mexico, settling in the capital Mexico city and then later Cuernavaca.

Work 

Zindato’s work is difficult to pin down into a predefined category, though he is often linked to the outsider-art, self-taught contemporary art fields. He has been represented and shown by galleries in New York, Paris, Berlin, Italy, Mexico City.

References

Further reading 

Charles Russell, Groundwaters: A Century of Self-taught and Outsider Artists, Prestel

Edward M. Gomez, “On the Border”, Art & Antiques Magazine, (February 2011)

Edward M. Gomez, “Domenico Zindato at Phyllis Kind,” Art in America (April 2008)

Edward M. Gomez, “Domenico Zindato’s Mystical, Mysterious World” Raw Vision (No. 58, Spring 2007)
	
N.F. Karlins, “Force of Nature,” artnet (2007)

Edward M. Gomez, Review of exhibition at P.K. Gallery, Raw Vision (No. 46, Spring 2004)
	
N.F. Karlins, “Outsider Art Fair 2004,” artnet (2004)

Roberta Smith, “Art So Out It’s Almost In,” New York Times (January 19, 2001)

Edward M. Gomez, “Discovering Art With the Aura of the Outsider,” New York Times (February 20, 2000)

N.F. Karlins, “Outsider report,” artnet. (2000)

Pamela Scheinman, “Domenico Zindato’s World Music on Paper,” Fiberarts Magazine (March/April 2000)

Switch magazine, Tokyo (No. 10, 1995)

Jens Pepper, “Spreeflorenz,” NeueBildendeKunst (No. 6, 1992)

D. Kuhlbrodt, “Rexdildo in Loulou Lasard,” TAZ Berlin (August 22, 1990)

Elke Melkus, “Verborgene Phantasien,” PRINZ magazine, Berlin (August 15, 1990)

E.A., “Bizarre Lust” TIP magazine, Berlin (No. 17, 1990)

Living people
1966 births
Italian artists